San Lorenzo Island is the largest island of Peru. The island is in the Pacific Ocean near the port of Callao and measures .

Sovereignty rights

San Lorenzo Island was incorporated in 1899 as territory of the Constitutional Province of Callao by decree of President Andrés Avelino Cáceres Dorregaray. The island was seized by the coup d'état government of Leguía y Salcedo and subsequently adoled out to navy sequestration in 1926. Under the unique status that Callao holds as Peru's only constitutionally formed province/region and without a change of status quo tilted in favor of a republic under civilian control, resolution of conflict over de facto vs de jure land use of San Lorenzo Island remains for global opinion and Peru's Supreme Court to resolve.

Access

, San Lorenzo is not open to the public.  It is a restricted zone controlled by the Marina de Guerra del Perú; in rare cases, specialized professionals (archaeologists, naturalists, etc.) may apply for and receive extraordinary permission to land on the island.  Civilian vessels are required to maintain a distance of at least  from the shore of the island.

Geography
Only eight kilometers long and two kilometers wide, San Lorenzo is the largest island in Peru. Its lack of fresh water has precluded urbanisation, although there are many projects to do so, including a bridge to connect the District of La Punta in nearby Callao with the island. Nearby is the small island of El Frontón, which is separated by a channel 800 m wide, called El Boqueron, and Palomino Islands, known for its populations of sea lions. Its maximum height is the Cerro La Mina at 396 m above sea level.

History

San Lorenzo has some archeological interest and includes artifacts of Incan and pre-Incan origin. It was used during the Battle of Callao as a burial place; its current under-use by the Peruvian Navy has led, in the first decades of the twenty-first century, to a new de facto status as an unlisted marine bioreserve, being the home to many creatures, notably scallops, seabirds, and sea lions.

The island never had permanent human occupation due to lack of freshwater sources. It was constantly visited by people of ancient Peru who used it as a cemetery. In fact in the mythology of ancient Peru central coast marine islands were related to the afterlife. The island was an important part in various stages of colonial Peruvian history, and for strengthening the independence of Peru and the Spanish-South American.

During colonial times, stones that were used to build various buildings like the old Presidio of Callao and the Royal Fortress Felipe  were extracted from the quarries. It was also, eventually, home base for several English and Dutch pirates, as Francis Drake and Jacques l'Hermite, who raided Callao. The latter died of plague along with some of his men and was buried on the island.

In 1866, in republican times, the Spanish Armada retreated to San Lorenzo after their defeat by Peruvian forces in the Battle of Callao, on 2 May. There the Spanish repaired their ships and buried their dead before leaving the Peruvian coast.

Charles Darwin explored the island in 1835 looking at the geology and nature. Subsequently, between 1906 and 1907, Max Uhle made the first excavations at the southern tip of the island, finding metal objects and mummies in a pre-Hispanic cemetery in the Caleta de la Cruz, that corresponds to the end of Intermediate and Late Horizon (AD 900 to 1.532).

In 1912 President Guillermo Billinghurst raised the proposal of building a dyke across the sea to Callao, an initial study being conducted by Dutch engineer J. Kraus in 1914. In 1958, the proposal was raised again by the Danish firm Christian & Nielsen, who put together a project that involved the transfer to the island of the fishing port and the creation of a new commercial port. The project did not materialize because of financial problems, lack of potable water and the impact that would have been caused on the island's wildlife.

In the first half of the 1990s, the naval base located on the island served as a temporary prison for the recently captured then leaders of the insurgent groups Shining Path and MRTA (Abimael Guzmán and Víctor Polay, respectively), as maximum security prisons were built for them.

In February 2010 the National Institute of Culture declared twenty existing archaeological monuments on the island "Cultural Patrimony of the Nation".

Future development

The future San Lorenzo is the subject of ongoing debate. With vast potential for development, a popular suggestion is to link San Lorenzo to the mainland by building a bridge to the nearby La Punta peninsula. This would allow development of the island as a tourist destination and as a megaport and airport similarly to Valparaíso. Opponents of this plan suggest that the Peruvian Navy should continue control of the island or that it becomes a fully protected nature reserve.

Notable prisoners
Abimael Guzmán 
Víctor Polay
Cristóbal Talcapillán

References in media

The island off Peru appears in a historical novel series by M.C. Muir, Under Admiralty Orders - The Oliver Quintrell Series.  In Book 2, The Tainted Prize, the island figures in the action involving two British Royal Navy ships and the Spanish Navy in 1804 (The Napoleonic Era).

The fictional Island of San Lorenzo is the setting for most of Kurt Vonnegut's book Cat's Cradle. This Island is the home of the religion Bokononism. Although the same name - the fictional island of San Lorenzo is located in the Caribbean Sea, positioned in the relative vicinity of Puerto Rico.

ISLA, a poem by Edgar Saavedra.

The short story, "The Pirate of the Island", in the collection, Ghostly Tales of Callao, by Mario Aragón.

See also
San Lorenzo Megaport Project

References

Uninhabited islands of Peru
Pacific islands of Peru
Landforms of Callao Region
Prison islands